Aquilla Lake is an artificial lake (reservoir) in Hill County, Texas, USA. The dam was constructed by the U.S. Army Corps of Engineers. The dam is part of the overall flood control project in the Brazos River basin.

The dam was built and is owned by the U.S. Army Corps of Engineers. A reinforced concrete inlet structure near the center of dam houses the flood-control gates and operating equipment. Closure of the dam began March 20, 1982, and the dam was completed in January 1983. Deliberate impoundment began April 29, 1983. The lake was built for water supply, flood control, and recreation purposes. Figures given herein represent total contents. Data regarding the dam and lake are given in the following table (USGS data):

Recreational activities on the lake include boating, fishing, hunting, and wildlife viewing.

Fishing
Largemouth bass fishing can be good on Aquilla. The combination of stained water, localized cover, and light fishing pressure means there are some big bass to catch but you have to work for them. Fish spinner baits, jig and pork combos, and plastic worms in and around cover. Tree lines, fencerows, and creek channels are good places to start. Crappie are usually found on submerged brushpiles and large isolated trees. Live minnows seem to be the preferred bait. Channel and blue catfish are caught drift fishing flats or on trotlines set around shallow, brushy areas. Shad, cutbait, or bloodbait will all work. White bass are caught trolling small tailspinners, jigs, and spoons across windy flats.

See also
List of lakes in Texas

References

External links
U.S. Army Corps of Engineers Lake Gateway: Aquilla Lake
GORP: Aquilla Dam and Lake
Texas Parks and Wildlife: Aquilla Lake
Recreation.gov – Aquilla Dam and Lake
U.S. Geological Survey: USGS Station 08093350 Aquilla Lake Above Aquilla, TX

Reservoirs in Texas
Dams in Texas
United States Army Corps of Engineers dams
Protected areas of Hill County, Texas
Dams completed in 1983
Bodies of water of Hill County, Texas
1983 establishments in Texas